The North Africa Post is a regional newspaper in the English language that was started in 2012. It aims to provide “global analysis of the MENA (Middle East and North Africa) region and beyond” The  paper started as a web version with the plan to edit a weekly newspaper.

The founder and editor-in-chief of the project is Sabah Lebbar, the former head of the English desk at Maghreb Arabe Press and correspondent of the government's news agency in Washington for several years. Its editorial direction places it as being close to the Moroccan government and pro-Moroccan in general with a certain mistrust of Algerian politics.

External links
 Official site

References

Newspapers published in Morocco
2012 establishments in Morocco
Publications established in 2012
Mass media in Rabat